"Out the Way" (stylized as "Out thë Way") is a song by American rapper Yeat from his sixth extended play Lyfe (2022). It was produced by BNYX and Snapz.

Composition and critical reception
The song finds Yeat rapping on an electric beat about his reckless behavior and drug use. He also demands for the release of the 28 YSL Records members that were arrested and charged with racketeering.

Kieran Press-Reynolds of Pitchfork described that in the song, "Yeat wrenches out dino burps and evil Peppa Pig honks over a beat so squiggly it's like he's in front of you doing a goofy little dance." Paul Attard of Slant Magazine noted Yeat's vocal inflections in the song as showing stylistic influences of Young Thug, Future and Playboi Carti "rather transparently", writing, "yet his approach isn't a cheap pastiche of these disparate styles."

Charts

Certifications

References

2022 songs
Yeat songs
Music videos directed by Cole Bennett